The Yankee Cannonball is a wooden out-and-back roller coaster built in 1930 at Lakewood Park and relocated in 1936 to Canobie Lake Park, Salem, New Hampshire.

History
The roller coaster was designed by Herbert Paul Schmeck of the Philadelphia Toboggan Coasters. Its serial number is 86. In 1930, it was installed under the name "Roller Coaster" at Lakewood Park in Waterbury, Connecticut. Frank F. Hoover oversaw the construction. The coaster operated in Connecticut for only five years before being closed and moved to Canobie Lake Park. It was rechristened the "Greyhound" in 1936 through the 1970s. and then eventually it was renamed the "Yankee Cannonball" in 1983. The name is in commemoration of the American Civil War. The coaster's train colors were originally blue and gray, representing the Union and Confederate sides of the conflict, all being united on the ride's red, white, and blue superstructure.

When the ride was moved to Canobie in 1936, each section was shortened by six inches to help it fit the area planned for it. The rethemed ride opened for the 1936 season and has operated continuously since, though the lift hill was destroyed by Hurricane Carol in 1954, and it was closed for repair during the following season.

The coaster's coloring has been altered since 1936 with retracking work done on the coaster. Some of this retracking was completed by Martin & Vleminckx. As of the 2009 season, the ride superstructure is white with orange handrails. One train is colored red, white, and blue, while the other is hunter green and orange. The coaster is one of the first rides seen when entering the park's parking lot. On June 20, 2013, the Yankee Cannonball was awarded the prestigious Coaster Landmark Award by ACE for its historical significance, thus cementing its status as a historic, cultural treasure.  Recently, they had expanded the queue line to fit more people due to the popularity of this ride.

Layout
The ride's layout is an out and back pattern with a 90° turn in the middle, creating the basic L-shape common in early wooden coasters. The primary elements include small hills designed to give moments of airtime and strongly banked turns.  Restraints on the trains used to consist of a single lap bar with no seat belts allowing single riders to slide across the seat, making full use of the banked turns. Seat belts and center seat dividers were later added. Once the site of an infield, the area inside the L-shape is now employee parking for the park.

Upon dispatch, the train takes a slight downward grade through a right turn into the 65' lift hill. The ride's initial drop is the largest at 63' 6". This is followed by a short airtime rise, then the second hill which has the 90° right turn at the top. Two small airtime rises precede the steeply banked 180° turnaround. The returning course takes the coaster parallel to the first half of the ride, traveling through a series of bunny hills, the brake run and a short turn into the station. The total duration of the ride is about one minute with a top speed of 35 mph.

Trains
The Yankee Cannonball has two trains, with three cars per train, but only one train runs at a time. Riders are arranged two across in three rows in each car for a total of 18 riders per train. The trains were built by Philadelphia Toboggan Coasters. Restraints consist of headrests and lap bars, and seat belts were added for the 2003 season, as a response to a 2001 accident, in which the two trains collided at the foot of the lift hill due to operator failure in engaging the brakes.

References

Roller coasters in New Hampshire
Buildings and structures in Rockingham County, New Hampshire
Roller coasters introduced in 1930
Salem, New Hampshire